Geodia breviana is a species of sponge in the family Geodiidae. It is found in the waters of the Pacific Ocean off the coast of California. It was first described by Robert J. Lendlmayer von Lendenfeld in 1910.

References

Tetractinellida
Sponges described in 1910